Before Midnight is a novel by American author Rex Stout, published in 1955 by Viking Press. It is the 25th detective novel  featuring curmudgeonly New York sleuth Nero Wolfe, as narrated by sidekick Archie Goodwin. The story was also collected in the omnibus volume Three Trumps (Viking 1973).

The story concerns Wolfe being hired to investigate documents missing from a million-dollar prize contest for a perfume company, with the title a reference to the deadline for winning entries: postmarked before midnight on the specified date. The investigation leads to murder and more. Numerous major works of literature are mentioned as part of the contest. Four poetic riddles describing real and fictional women are given, and three of them are solved, two by Archie, and one by Wolfe. The fourth is never solved within the text.

Plot summary
Nero Wolfe is approached by corporate attorney Rudolf Hansen and his clients Oliver Buff, Vernon Assa and Patrick O'Garro, the chief executives of Manhattan advertising agency Lippert Buff Assa (LBA). The group want Wolfe to save them from embarrassment and ruin following the murder of Louis Dahlmann, an up-and-coming advertising executive with the firm. Dahlmann's wallet was also stolen, and inside were the final answers for a series of cryptic poetic riddles run as part of a promotional competition for Pour Amour, a brand of perfume designed by one of LBA's clients. The first prize of the competition is $500,000, and in a meeting with the final five contestants the night before his death Dahlmann had revealed that he kept the answers in his wallet, both of which lead the police to suspect one of the contestants. The executives, however, do not want Wolfe to investigate the murder but to find out who stole the wallet before the contest deadline—midnight of the nineteenth of April, exactly one week later—in order to ensure the integrity of proceedings and restore their reputation. Despite tension between the advertising agency and Talbott Heery, owner of the company that produces Pour Amour, Wolfe agrees to their terms.

Wolfe dispatches Archie Goodwin to secure a copy of the final riddles and their answers for Wolfe's reference, and proceeds to interview each of the contestants: Gertrude Frazee, the leader of an anti-cosmetics women's group who has been using her members to find the answers for the riddles to try and embarrass the cosmetics industry; Carol Wheelock, a housewife who wants the prize money to secure a better life for her family; Harold Rollins, a condescending academic who entered the competition as part of an intellectual exercise; Susan Tescher, a magazine editor who wants to do a profile on Wolfe himself; and Philip Younger, a retiree seeking to recover a fortune he lost during the Great Depression. Although skeptical that Wolfe is only investigating the theft and not the murder, Inspector Cramer shares what the police have learned about the case so far. Other than the financial motive, none of the contestants appears to have had any serious reason or opportunity to either murder Dahlmann or steal the answers, and much to Archie's concern Wolfe's investigation appears to lose energy and focus.

As the deadline nears, the LBA executives begin to panic and lash out, resulting in a contradictory sequence where Wolfe is fired and then rehired within a span of minutes. When all seems lost, however, an anonymous source sends copies of the answers to each of the contestants, thus voiding the contest and saving LBA. Although Archie, the LBA executives and the police suspect Wolfe of doing so, he insists that he was not responsible, and begins to suspect one of the advertising executives of at least stealing the wallet, if not murdering Dahlmann. After the letters are sent, Vernon Assa approaches Wolfe and attempts to unilaterally dismiss him from the case, but Wolfe refuses. His suspicions aroused, Wolfe summons the major players to his office and claims he will reveal the identity of the thief, and in doing so provide the police with vital information to help them identify the murderer. Before he can do so, however, Vernon Assa is poisoned with cyanide surreptitiously slipped into his drink and dies on the floor of Wolfe's office. Dahlmann's wallet is found in his pocket, suggesting that he was the thief and murderer.

Infuriated at the murder of someone who was enjoying his hospitality and skeptical of Assa's guilt, Wolfe determines to identify the true culprit. He, along with Archie and Saul Panzer, travels to the offices of LBA and inspects a display of products from their clients, discovering a bottle of cyanide that he suspects was used to murder Assa; this confirms in Wolfe's mind the guilt of one of the executives. Confronting Buff, O'Garro and Hansen, Wolfe lays out the facts of the case and accuses Buff of murdering both Dahlmann and Assa. Buff is the only man who had clear means and opportunity, and Wolfe speculates that he was driven to murder Dahlmann out of jealousy and fear over Dahlmann's skills eclipsing and threatening his position. Assa discovered the wallet that Buff stole from Dahlmann to cover his tracks, and Buff murdered him to silence him. When Buff tries to throw suspicion on O'Garro, O'Garro reveals that Wolfe is correct. Buff is convicted of murder, but the remaining LBA executives challenge Wolfe's fee, arguing that as the thief and murderer Buff presumably exposed himself when he sent out the letters containing the final answers. In response, Wolfe reveals in confidence that he will be adding onto his bill the price of a used typewriter that has been disposed of in the East River, implying that he was in fact responsible for sending out the letters and saving them from humiliation after all.

Cast of characters
 Nero Wolfe—Sedentary Manhattan private detective, orchid fancier, gourmet/gourmand, and self-educated man, with an extensive personal library/office where he conducts nearly all business
 Archie Goodwin—Wolfe's live-in right-hand man (assistant), agent provocateur, man of action
 Fritz Brenner—The Wolfe household's live-in world-class Swiss French chef
 Rudolph Hansen—attorney at law, representing Lippert, Buff & Assa (LBA), a prominent Madison Avenue advertising agency
 Oliver Buff—a partner in LBA
 Patrick O'Garro—another partner in LBA
 Vernon Assa—Third and final partner of LBA (Mr Lippert has been dead for a while, and Mr. O'Garro has taken his place)
 Talbott Heery—Owner of Heery Products, a major cosmetics company, and in particular the Pour Amour brand of perfume being promoted by LBA in a major contest.
 Louis Dahlmann—employee of LBA, in charge of the Heery account, creator of the perfume contest, but now murdered and his wallet stolen, the latter detail being more urgent to LBA than the former.
 Finalists in the perfume contest, from all over the US, but brought to NYC by LBA/Heery for the final round of the perfume contest
 Susan Tescher, from NYC, and editor at Clock magazine besides contestant in the perfume contest
 Mr Hibbard, attorney,
 Mr Schulz, associate editor,
 Mr Knudsen, senior editor, all staff of Clock who accompany Ms. Tescher on a visit to Wolfe, not only about the contest but hoping to do an article on Wolfe himself.
 Carol Wheelock, from Richmond, Virginia
 Philip Younger, from Chicago, Illinois
 Harold Rollins, from Burlington, Iowa
 Gertrude Frazee, from Los Angeles, California, founder and president of the Woman's Nature League, a pressure group opposed to women using cosmetics. Ms Frazee's dialogue includes a graphic description of the source of musk
 Doctor Vollmer—a neighbor and friend of Wolfe, called upon whenever a dead body is discovered in the Wolfe household, something that, based on past Wolfe novels, happens distressingly often.
 Theodore Horstmann—The Wolfe household's orchid nurse, rarely seen outside the plant rooms on the roof the brownstone.
 Saul Panzer—high-priced freelance detective whom Wolfe uses, not always with the foreknowledge of Goodwin, to perform difficult and sensitive tasks for which Archie cannot be spared, or which Wolfe wants to (temporarily) hide from Archie. In Nero Wolfe novels, such a maneuver is nearly always a place where the reader should pause, because Wolfe has made a deduction that he hasn't revealed to Archie.
 Fred Durkin, Orrie Cather, Bill Gore - Freelance operatives Wolfe uses to help find specific evidence near the novel's conclusion. Johnny Keems, another operative Wolfe sometimes uses, is mentioned but ultimately not hired. Gore's final appearance in a Stout volume.

The unfamiliar word
Wolfe notes a bill introduced in British Parliament in 1770 which would punish women for wearing makeup and other fashions, including "Spanish wool," a term Wolfe is unfamiliar with.  It was a form of rouge.

Reviews and commentary
Jacques Barzun and Wendell Hertig Taylor, A Catalogue of Crime — It is brisk and clever enough, but not one in which Archie shines with special luster."
Terry Teachout, About Last Night, "Forty years with Nero Wolfe" (January 12, 2009) — Rex Stout's witty, fast-moving prose hasn't dated a day, while Wolfe himself is one of the enduringly great eccentrics of popular fiction. I've spent the past four decades reading and re-reading Stout's novels for pleasure, and they have yet to lose their savor  ... It is to revel in such writing that I return time and again to Stout's books, and in particular to The League of Frightened Men, Some Buried Caesar, The Silent Speaker, Too Many Women, Murder by the Book, Before Midnight, Plot It Yourself, Too Many Clients, The Doorbell Rang, and Death of a Doxy, which are for me the best of all the full-length Wolfe novels.

Publication history
1955, New York: Viking Press, October 27, 1955, hardcoverIn his limited-edition pamphlet, Collecting Mystery Fiction #9, Rex Stout's Nero Wolfe Part I, Otto Penzler describes the first edition of Before Midnight: "Pale blue cloth, front cover and spine printed with dark blue; rear cover blank. Issued in a mainly black dust wrapper."In April 2006, Firsts: The Book Collector's Magazine estimated that the first edition of Before Midnight had a value of between $200 and $350. The estimate is for a copy in very good to fine condition in a like dustjacket.The "concept-driven" dustjacket designed by Bill English was cited by graphic design scholar Steven Heller for its modernist techniques—photomontage, spare use of color, sans-serif typography and use of the entire front and back cover area.
1956, New York: Viking Press (Mystery Guild), January 1956, hardcoverThe far less valuable Viking book club edition may be distinguished from the first edition in three ways:
 The dust jacket has "Book Club Edition" printed on the inside front flap, and the price is absent (first editions may be price clipped if they were given as gifts).
 Book club editions are sometimes thinner and always taller (usually a quarter of an inch) than first editions.
 Book club editions are bound in cardboard, and first editions are bound in cloth (or have at least a cloth spine).
1956, London: Collins Crime Club, May 7, 1956, hardcover
1957, New York: Bantam #A1632, July 1957, paperback
1962, London: Fontana #725, 1962
1973, New York: Viking Press, Three Trumps: A Nero Wolfe Omnibus (with If Death Ever Slept and The Black Mountain), April 1973, hardcover

1995, New York: Bantam Books  November 1, 1995, paperback
2004, Auburn, California: The Audio Partners Publishing Corp., Mystery Masters  September 2004, audio CD (unabridged, read by Michael Prichard)
2010, New York: Bantam  May 19, 2010, e-book

References

External links

1955 American novels
Nero Wolfe novels by Rex Stout
Novels about writers
Viking Press books